Gennes-Longuefuye is a commune in the Mayenne department in north-western France. It was established on 1 January 2019 by merger of the former communes of Gennes-sur-Glaize (the seat) and Longuefuye.

See also
Communes of the Mayenne department

References

Genneslonguefuye
Populated places established in 2019
2019 establishments in France